The Kutukú rat (Mindomys kutuku) is a species of sigmodontine rodent in the tribe Oryzomyini found in the isolated Kutukú Mountains of eastern Ecuador.

See also

 List of mammals of Ecuador

References

Oryzomyini
Endemic fauna of Ecuador
Mammals of Ecuador
Mammals described in 2022